Ahmad Jamal at the Blackhawk is a live album by American jazz pianist Ahmad Jamal featuring performances  recorded in San Francisco in 1962 and released on the Argo label.

Critical reception
AllMusic awarded the album 3 stars.

Track listing
 "I'll Take Romance / My Funny Valentine" (Ben Oakland, Oscar Hammerstein II / Lorenz Hart, Richard Rodgers) – 6:12  
 "Like Someone in Love" (Johnny Burke, Jimmy Van Heusen) – 2:46  
 "Falling in Love With Love" (Hart, Rodgers) – 4:15  
 "The Best Thing for You" (Irving Berlin) – 4:57  
 "April in Paris" (Vernon Duke, E. Y. Harburg) – 4:15  
 "The Second Time Around" (Sammy Cahn, Van Heusen) – 4:07  
 "We Live in Two Different Worlds" (Fred Rose) – 4:24  
 "Night Mist Blues" (Ahmad Jamal) – 6:45

Personnel
Ahmad Jamal – piano
Israel Crosby – bass
Vernel Fournier – drums

References 

Argo Records live albums
Ahmad Jamal live albums
1962 live albums
Albums recorded at the Black Hawk (nightclub)